Dinakdakan, also known as warek-warek, is a Filipino dish consisting of various pork head parts, red onions, siling haba or siling labuyo chilis, ginger, black peppercorns, calamansi juice, and bay leaves. The pork parts are first boiled in the aromatics for an hour or so until tender, and then further grilled until lightly charred. They are chopped into small pieces and served in a creamy sauce traditionally made from mashed cooked pig's brain, though this is commonly substituted with mayonnaise. The pork parts used commonly include pork jowls (maskara), pork collar, and ears. Sometimes pork tongue, liver, stomach, and intestines are also included. Dinakdakan is most commonly served as pulutan, appetizers that are eaten with beer or other alcoholic drinks. But it can also be eaten with rice.

Dinakdakan is very similar to the sisig of Kapampangan cuisine, except that it is not as finely chopped and is always served with in a sauce made from mashed brain or mayonnaise.

See also
Paklay
 List of pork dishes

References

Philippine cuisine
Pork dishes
Ilocano cuisine